The 1988–89 Miami Heat season was Miami's inaugural season in the NBA. The Heat were the first of two expansion teams to play in the state of Florida over a two-year period, and along with the Charlotte Hornets, joined the NBA in 1988. The team revealed a new primary logo of a red basketball on fire going through a hoop, and got new uniforms adding red and black to their color scheme. In the 1988 NBA expansion draft, the Heat selected veteran players like Billy Thompson, Fred Roberts, Jon Sundvold, Darnell Valentine, Dwayne "Pearl" Washington and Scott Hastings. However, Roberts was traded to the Milwaukee Bucks, and Valentine was dealt to the Cleveland Cavaliers. The team also signed free agents Pat Cummings and Rory Sparrow during the off-season. The Heat received the ninth overall pick in the 1988 NBA draft, and selected center Rony Seikaly out of Syracuse University, while other rookies included first round draft pick Kevin Edwards, and second round draft picks Grant Long and Sylvester Gray. The team hired Ron Rothstein as their first head coach.

The Heat made their debut on November 5, 1988, in a losing effort to the Los Angeles Clippers by a score of 111–91 at the Miami Arena; Sparrow made the first basket in franchise history. The Heat lost an NBA record 17 games to start their inaugural season. On December 14, the team won their first game of the season by beating the Clippers in Los Angeles by a score of 89–88. Five games later, the Heat won their first game ever at home when they beat the Utah Jazz, 101–80. The Heat struggled all season long, holding a dreadful 5–40 record at the All-Star break, and finishing last place in the Midwest Division with a 15–67 record. 

The club's leading scorer was Edwards, who averaged a low team-high of 13.8 points, and contributed 4.4 assists and 1.8 steals per game, and was also selected to the NBA All-Rookie Second Team, while Sparrow averaged 12.5 points, 5.4 assists and 1.3 steals per game, and Long provided the team with 11.9 points, 6.7 rebounds and 1.5 steals per game. In addition, Seikaly averaged 10.9 points and 7.0 rebounds per game, while Thompson provided with 10.8 points and 7.2 rebounds per game, and Sundvold contributed 10.4 points per game off the bench, while shooting .522 in three-point field-goal percentage. Cummings averaged 8.8 points and 5.3 rebounds per game, while Gray provided with 8.0 points and 5.2 rebounds per game, and Washington contributed 7.6 points and 4.2 assists per game.

Despite their location in Miami, Florida, the NBA placed the Heat in the Midwest Division of the Western Conference; this meant that the Heat were forced on some of the longest and farthest road trips in the NBA in 1988–89, as their closest divisional opponent was the Houston Rockets, which were located over 950 miles away.

The team's primary logo and uniforms both remained in use until 1999.

Offseason

Expansion Draft

Draft picks

Roster

Regular season

Season standings

z – clinched division title
y – clinched division title
x – clinched playoff spot

Record vs. opponents

Game log

|- align="center" bgcolor="edbebf"
| 1 || November 5, 1988 || L.A. Clippers || L 91–111 || Miami Arena || 15,008 || 0–1
|- align="center" bgcolor="edbebf"
| 2 || November 8, 1988 || @ Dallas || L 88–92 || Reunion Arena || 16,129 || 0–2
|- align="center" bgcolor="edbebf"
| 3 || November 9, 1988 || @ San Antonio || L 93–117 || HemisFair Arena || || 0–3
|- align="center" bgcolor="edbebf"
| 4 || November 11, 1988 || Houston || L 100–121 || Miami Arena || 15,008 || 0–4
|- align="center" bgcolor="edbebf"
| 5 || November 15, 1988 || Boston || L 65–84 || Miami Arena || 15,008 || 0–5
|- align="center" bgcolor="edbebf"
| 6 || November 17, 1988 || @ Houston || L 107–113 || The Summit || 16,288 || 0–6
|- align="center" bgcolor="edbebf"
| 7 || November 18, 1988 || Golden State || L 117–123 (OT) || Miami Arena || 13,907 || 0–7
|- align="center" bgcolor="edbebf"
| 8 || November 23, 1988 || L.A. Lakers || L 91–138 || Miami Arena || 15,008 || 0–8
|- align="center" bgcolor="edbebf"
| 9 || November 26, 1988 || @ Milwaukee || L 93–103 || Bradley Center || 18,573 || 0–9
|- align="center" bgcolor="edbebf"
| 10 || November 27, 1988 || @ Cleveland || L 80–109 || Richfield Coliseum || || 0–10
|- align="center" bgcolor="edbebf"
| 11 || November 29, 1988 || @ Charlotte || L 84–99 || Charlotte Coliseum || 23,388 || 0–11
|- align="center" bgcolor="edbebf"
| 12 || November 30, 1988 || San Antonio || L 101–105 || Miami Arena || 14,298 || 0–12
|-

|- align="center" bgcolor="edbebf"
| 13 || December 2, 1988 || Portland || L 102–105 || Miami Arena || 15,008 || 0–13
|- align="center" bgcolor="edbebf"
| 14 || December 7, 1988 || Sacramento || L 94–96 || Miami Arena || 15,008 || 0–14
|- align="center" bgcolor="edbebf"
| 15 || December 9, 1988 || Denver || L 110–121 || Miami Arena || 14,812 || 0–15
|- align="center" bgcolor="edbebf"
| 16 || December 10, 1988 || @ Chicago || L 88–111 || Chicago Stadium || 17,615 || 0–16
|- align="center" bgcolor="edbebf"
| 17 || December 12, 1988 || @ Utah || L 94–110 || Salt Palace || 12,444 || 0–17
|- align="center" bgcolor="#bbffbb"
| 18 || December 14, 1988 || @ L.A. Clippers || W 89–88 || Los Angeles Memorial Sports Arena || || 1–17
|- align="center" bgcolor="edbebf"
| 19 || December 15, 1988 || @ Sacramento || L 90–94 || ARCO Arena || 16,517 || 1–18
|- align="center" bgcolor="edbebf"
| 20 || December 17, 1988 || Dallas || L 87–104 || Miami Arena || 15,008 || 1–19
|- align="center" bgcolor="edbebf"
| 21 || December 20, 1988 || @ Detroit || L 100–116 || The Palace of Auburn Hills || 21,454 || 1–20
|- align="center" bgcolor="edbebf"
| 22 || December 21, 1988 || Seattle || L 101–109 || Miami Arena || 15,008 || 1–21
|- align="center" bgcolor="#bbffbb"
| 23 || December 23, 1988 || Utah || W 101–80 || Miami Arena || 15,008 || 2–21
|- align="center" bgcolor="#bbffbb"
| 24 || December 26, 1988 || San Antonio || W 111–109 || Miami Arena || 15,008 || 3–21
|- align="center" bgcolor="edbebf"
| 25 || December 27, 1988 || Houston || L 93–101 || Miami Arena || 15,008 || 3–22
|- align="center" bgcolor="edbebf"
| 26 || December 29, 1988 || @ Seattle || L 99–129 || Seattle Center Coliseum || 14,794 || 3–23
|- align="center" bgcolor="edbebf"
| 27 || December 30, 1988 || @ Denver || L 83–109 || McNichols Sports Arena || 12,214 || 3–24
|-

|- align="center" bgcolor="edbebf"
| 28 || January 3, 1989 || @ Portland || L 95–119 || Memorial Coliseum || 12,848 || 3–25
|- align="center" bgcolor="edbebf"
| 29 || January 4, 1989 || @ Golden State || L 100–109 || Oakland–Alameda County Coliseum Arena || 12,831 || 3–26
|- align="center" bgcolor="edbebf"
| 30 || January 6, 1989 || @ L.A. Lakers || L 86–118 || Great Western Forum || 17,505 || 3–27
|- align="center" bgcolor="edbebf"
| 31 || January 7, 1989 || @ Phoenix || L 99–107 || Arizona Veterans Memorial Coliseum || 12,288 || 3–28
|- align="center" bgcolor="edbebf"
| 32 || January 10, 1989 || Utah || L 88–92 || Miami Arena || 15,008 || 3–29
|- align="center" bgcolor="edbebf"
| 33 || January 12, 1989 || @ Washington || L 100–106 || Capital Centre || || 3–30
|- align="center" bgcolor="edbebf"
| 34 || January 13, 1989 || Milwaukee || L 101–107 || Miami Arena || 15,008 || 3–31
|- align="center" bgcolor="#bbffbb"
| 35 || January 15, 1989 || Indiana || W 118–117 (2OT) || Miami Arena || 15,008 || 4–31
|- align="center" bgcolor="edbebf"
| 36 || January 19, 1989 || Chicago || L 108–112 || Miami Arena || 15,008 || 4–32
|- align="center" bgcolor="edbebf"
| 37 || January 23, 1989 || @ San Antonio || L 101–119 || HemisFair Arena || || 4–33
|- align="center" bgcolor="edbebf"
| 38 || January 24, 1989 || @ Houston || L 93–118 || The Summit || 16,611 || 4–34
|- align="center" bgcolor="edbebf"
| 39 || January 26, 1989 || Denver || L 108–129 || Miami Arena || 15,008 || 4–35
|- align="center" bgcolor="edbebf"
| 40 || January 29, 1989 || @ Boston || L 103–121 || Boston Garden || 14,890 || 4–36
|- align="center" bgcolor="edbebf"
| 41 || January 30, 1989 || Golden State || L 98–105 || Miami Arena || 14,880 || 4–37
|-

|- align="center" bgcolor="edbebf"
| 42 || February 2, 1989 || Seattle || L 93–100 || Miami Arena || 14,798 || 4–38
|- align="center" bgcolor="#bbffbb"
| 43 || February 5, 1989 || Sacramento || W 102–98 || Miami Arena || 15,008 || 5–38
|- align="center" bgcolor="edbebf"
| 44 || February 7, 1989 || @ Utah || L 77–96 || Salt Palace || 12,444 || 5–39
|- align="center" bgcolor="edbebf"
| 45 || February 9, 1989 || @ Denver || L 92–117 || McNichols Sports Arena || 14,935 || 5–40
|- align="center" bgcolor="edbebf"
| 46 || February 14, 1989 || Cleveland || L 98–109 || Miami Arena || 15,008 || 5–41
|- align="center" bgcolor="edbebf"
| 47 || February 16, 1989 || @ Dallas || L 80–93 || Reunion Arena || 17,007 || 5–42
|- align="center" bgcolor="#bbffbb"
| 48 || February 17, 1989 || Charlotte || W 103–102 || Miami Arena || 15,008 || 6–42
|- align="center" bgcolor="#bbffbb"
| 49 || February 19, 1989 || Atlanta || W 124–115 || Miami Arena || 15,008 || 7–42
|- align="center" bgcolor="edbebf"
| 50 || February 20, 1989 || @ New Jersey || L 109–117 || Brendan Byrne Arena || || 7–43
|- align="center" bgcolor="edbebf"
| 51 || February 22, 1989 || Philadelphia || L 108–139 || Miami Arena || 15,008 || 7–44
|- align="center" bgcolor="#bbffbb"
| 52 || February 24, 1989 || L.A. Clippers || W 111–91 || Miami Arena || 15,008 || 8–44
|- align="center" bgcolor="edbebf"
| 53 || February 26, 1989 || Portland || L 102–124 || Miami Arena || 15,008 || 8–45
|- align="center" bgcolor="edbebf"
| 54 || February 28, 1989 || Dallas || L 110–111 (OT) || Miami Arena || 14,779 || 8–46
|-

|- align="center" bgcolor="edbebf"
| 55 || March 2, 1989 || @ New York || L 123–132 || Madison Square Garden || 14,054 || 8–47
|- align="center" bgcolor="edbebf"
| 56 || March 3, 1989 || Utah || L 95–107 || Miami Arena || 15,008 || 8–48
|- align="center" bgcolor="edbebf"
| 57 || March 5, 1989 || Detroit || L 100–109 || Miami Arena || 15,008 || 8–49
|- align="center" bgcolor="edbebf"
| 58 || March 8, 1989 || L.A. Lakers || L 87–127 || Miami Arena || 15,008 || 8–50
|- align="center" bgcolor="#bbffbb"
| 59 || March 10, 1989 || Denver || W 131–130 (2OT) || Miami Arena || 15,008 || 9–50
|- align="center" bgcolor="edbebf"
| 60 || March 11, 1989 || @ Atlanta || L 78–111 || The Omni || 16,371 || 9–51
|- align="center" bgcolor="edbebf"
| 61 || March 13, 1989 || Phoenix || L 104–112 || Miami Arena || 15,008 || 9–52
|- align="center" bgcolor="#bbffbb"
| 62 || March 15, 1989 || @ L.A. Clippers || W 109–103 || Los Angeles Memorial Sports Arena || || 10–52
|- align="center" bgcolor="edbebf"
| 63 || March 17, 1989 || @ Utah || L 96–118 || Salt Palace || 12,444 || 10–53
|- align="center" bgcolor="edbebf"
| 64 || March 18, 1989 || @ Denver || L 105–111 || McNichols Sports Arena || 15,068 || 10–54
|- align="center" bgcolor="edbebf"
| 65 || March 20, 1989 || @ Phoenix || L 97–115 || Arizona Veterans Memorial Coliseum || 12,315 || 10–55
|- align="center" bgcolor="#bbffbb"
| 66 || March 22, 1989 || New York || W 107–103 || Miami Arena || 15,008 || 11–55
|- align="center" bgcolor="#bbffbb"
| 67 || March 25, 1989 || San Antonio || W 107–105 || Miami Arena || 15,008 || 12–55
|- align="center" bgcolor="#bbffbb"
| 68 || March 27, 1989 || New Jersey || W 100–79 || Miami Arena || 15,008 || 13–55
|- align="center" bgcolor="edbebf"
| 69 || March 29, 1989 || @ Indiana || L 89–96 || Market Square Arena || || 13–56
|- align="center" bgcolor="edbebf"
| 70 || March 31, 1989 || @ Philadelphia || L 93–114 || Spectrum || 14,127 || 13–57
|-

|- align="center" bgcolor="edbebf"
| 71 || April 2, 1989 || @ Dallas || L 96–98 || Reunion Arena || 16,846 || 13–58
|- align="center" bgcolor="edbebf"
| 72 || April 4, 1989 || @ San Antonio || 87–109 || HemisFair Arena || || 13–59
|- align="center" bgcolor="edbebf"
| 73 || April 6, 1989 || Washington || L 93–101 || Miami Arena || 15,008 || 13–60
|- align="center" bgcolor="#bbffbb"
| 74 || April 8, 1989 || Houston || W 107–104 (OT) || Miami Arena || 15,008 || 14–60
|- align="center" bgcolor="edbebf"
| 75 || April 10, 1989 || @ Sacramento || L 69–108 || ARCO Arena || 16,517 || 14–61
|- align="center" bgcolor="edbebf"
| 76 || April 11, 1989 || @ Golden State || L 98–114 || Oakland–Alameda County Coliseum Arena || 15,025 || 14–62
|- align="center" bgcolor="edbebf"
| 77 || April 13, 1989 || @ Seattle || L 111–116 || Seattle Center Coliseum || 11,267 || 14–63
|- align="center" bgcolor="edbebf"
| 78 || April 14, 1989 || @ Portland || L 86–97 || Memorial Coliseum || 12,880 || 14–64
|- align="center" bgcolor="edbebf"
| 79 || April 16, 1989 || @ L.A. Lakers || L 108–121 || Great Western Forum || 17,505 || 14–65
|- align="center" bgcolor="edbebf"
| 80 || April 18, 1989 || Dallas || L 99–103 || Miami Arena || 15,008 || 14–66
|- align="center" bgcolor="edbebf"
| 81 || April 19, 1989 || Phoenix || L 91–117 || Miami Arena || 15,008 || 14–67
|- align="center" bgcolor="#bbffbb"
| 82 || April 22, 1989 || @ Houston || W 91–89 || The Summit || 16,611 || 15–67
|-

|-
| 1988-89 Schedule

Awards, records, and honors
 Kevin Edwards, NBA All-Rookie Second Team

Player stats
Note: GP= Games played; REB= Rebounds; AST= Assists; STL = Steals; BLK = Blocks; PTS = Points; AVG = Average

Transactions

References

 Heat on Database Basketball
 Heat on Basketball Reference

Miami Heat seasons
Miami
Miami Heat
Miami Heat